Sergei Yurevich Miroshnichenko (born June 21, 1979) is a Kazakhstani professional ice hockey defenceman who currently plays for Yertis Pavlodar of the Kazakhstan Hockey Championship.

Career statistics

References

External links

Living people
1979 births
Gornyak Rudny players
Sportspeople from Oskemen
Kazakhmys Satpaev players
Kazakhstani ice hockey defencemen
Kazzinc-Torpedo players
Saryarka Karagandy players
Yertis Pavlodar players
Asian Games silver medalists for Kazakhstan
Medalists at the 2007 Asian Winter Games
Asian Games medalists in ice hockey
Ice hockey players at the 2007 Asian Winter Games